Rosa Peris Cervera (Benaguasil, Spain, 25 February 1969) is a Spanish politician who belongs to the governing Spanish Socialist Workers' Party.

Peris qualified in law and first worked as a lawyer. In 1999 she was elected local councillor for her hometown of Benaguasil and the following year she entered national politics when she was elected to the national parliament as a deputy for Valencia. She did not stand in 2004. Subsequently she served as Director General of the Women's institute of Spain.

References

External links
 Biography at Spanish Congress website

1969 births
Living people
People from Camp de Túria
Politicians from the Valencian Community
Members of the 7th Congress of Deputies (Spain)
Spanish Socialist Workers' Party politicians
21st-century Spanish women politicians
20th-century Spanish women